Carraro is an Italian surname. Notable people with the surname include:

 Aldana Carraro (1994–2015), Argentine female artistic gymnast
 Daniela Carraro (born 1985), Brazilian sports shooter
 Emanuela Setti Carraro (1950–1982), Italian nurse and wife of General Carlo Alberto dalla Chiesa
 Federico Carraro (born 1992), Italian footballer 
 Flavio Roberto Carraro (1932–2022), Italian Roman Catholic prelate
 Franco Carraro (1939), Italian sport manager and politician
 Giuseppe Carraro (1899–1980), Italian Roman Catholic prelate
 Marco Carraro (born 1998), Italian footballer
 Martina Carraro (born 1993), Italian swimmer
 Massimo Carraro (born 1959), Italian university professor, entrepreneur and politician
 Tino Carraro (1910–1995), Italian actor

See also
 Carraro Agritalia, Italian tractor manufacturer

Italian-language surnames